Lowell J. Sherman (October 11, 1888 – December 28, 1934) was an American actor and film director. In an unusual practice for the time, he served as both actor and director on several films in the early 1930s. He later turned exclusively to directing. Having scored huge successes directing the films She Done Him Wrong (starring Mae West) and Morning Glory (which won Katharine Hepburn her first Academy Award), he was at the height of his career when he died after a brief illness.

Early life and career
Born in San Francisco in 1888 to John Sherman and Julia Louise Gray, who were both connected with the theater; John as a theatrical management agent and Julia as a stage actress. His maternal grandmother had been an actress, starring with the actor Edwin Booth (brother of actor-assassin John Wilkes Booth). Sherman began his career as a child actor appearing in many touring companies.

As an adolescent he appeared on Broadway in plays such as Judith of Bethulia (1904) with Nance O'Neil and in David Belasco's 1905 smash hit The Girl of the Golden West with Blanche Bates where he was a young Pony Express rider.

By 1915, Sherman was appearing in silent films usually playing playboys, until D. W. Griffith cast him as the villain in the film, Way Down East (1920). He continued playing villains or playboys in films, as he had in the theatre, throughout the 1920s, in such films as Molly O' (1921), A Lady of Chance (1929) and later in talkies such as Ladies of Leisure (1930), and What Price Hollywood? (1932).

In 1921, Sherman was in San Francisco attending a party as a guest of friend Roscoe Arbuckle at the St. Francis Hotel. He was in an adjoining room with madam Maude Delmont when Arbuckle was with Virginia Rappe. Rappe died four days afterwards. Lurid allegations circulated that Arbuckle had raped her at the party and inflicted injuries which directly caused her death. Arbuckle was arrested for murder (later downgraded to manslaughter), and Sherman had to testify during the ensuing trial.

Sherman's career did not significantly suffer from the fallout of his attendance at the party. On Broadway in 1923, Sherman played the aptly suited Casanova in a play of that name; his leading lady was Katharine Cornell. His sole Broadway directing credit was in 1923's Morphia, in which he also starred. His suave reputation was built after many years appearing in Broadway farces. Even after he became a successful silent film star, he continued to perform on Broadway, his last role being in The Woman Disputed, which ran from September 1926 through March 1927.

Though successful, Sherman was not entirely happy with his career as an actor, stating "Nothing becomes so monotonous as acting on the stage, especially if you are successful ... working in the movies seemed even duller." In 1930, RKO executive William LeBaron gave him the opportunity he was looking for; allowing him to star in and direct the film, Lawful Larceny. Sherman had starred in the Broadway production of the play the film was based on, and reprised his role. Over the next three years, he starred and directed himself in seven more films, including Bachelor Apartment (1931) with Irene Dunne, The Royal Bed (1931) with Mary Astor, and The Greeks Had a Word for Them (1932) with Joan Blondell.

In 1933, he focused on his directing duties. 1932's The Greeks Had a Word for Them was his last acting role, either on stage or screen. The five films where his sole responsibility was directing were all critical and financial successes. He directed Mae West in her first starring film She Done Him Wrong (Paramount Pictures, 1933), and followed that with Katharine Hepburn's Oscar-winning performance in Morning Glory (RKO Radio Pictures, 1933). He also directed Broadway Through a Keyhole (Twentieth Century Pictures, 1933) with Russ Columbo, and Born to Be Bad (United Artists, 1934) with Loretta Young and Cary Grant (who he had worked with on She Done Him Wrong). His final work, Night Life of the Gods (Universal Pictures), was released in 1935, after Sherman's death, and was another critical and financial success.

Personal life
Sherman was married three times and had no children. His first marriage was to actress Evelyn Booth, sister of playwright John Hunter Booth, whom he married on March 11, 1914. Booth filed for divorce claiming that Sherman neglected to provide for her and was cruel. She was granted a divorce on March 19, 1922. In 1926, he married actress Pauline Garon. Sherman filed for divorce on January 25, 1929, claiming that Garon had deserted him in August 1928 at the insistence of her parents. The divorce was granted in March 1929. His third and final marriage was with actress Helene Costello, the younger sister of Dolores Costello. They married on March 15, 1930, in Beverly Hills. This made Sherman a brother-in-law of longtime friend John Barrymore and both appeared in Barrymore's early talkie General Crack. The two however fell out after a comment Sherman made to Barrymore, about Shakespeare portrayals, in the garden of Barrymore's Tower Road home. Sherman and Helene separated in November 1931 and were divorced in May 1932.

Death
On December 28, 1934, Sherman died at a Los Angeles hospital of double pneumonia. Sherman is interred at Forest Lawn Memorial Park, Glendale.

At the time of his death, Sherman was directing Becky Sharp, the first film to be shot entirely in the three-strip Technicolor technique. Even after he became ill, Sherman continued to work on the project, and was 25 days into production. Upon his death, Rouben Mamoulian was brought in to finish the film. Mamoulian did not use any of the footage shot by Sherman, choosing instead to reshoot the entire film.

Louella Parsons broke the news of Sherman's death on her Hollywood Hotel radio broadcast, treating it as a scoop. Listeners immediately called in to protest her unsympathetic handling of the news. She was temporarily suspended by the J. Wallis Armstrong Agency, which represented the sponsor of the show, the Campbell Soup Company.

Broadway career

Judith of Bethulia (1904)
The System of Dr. Tarr (1905)
Strolling Players (1905)
The Girl of the Golden West (1906) - Rider of the Pony Express
The Girl of the Golden West (1907) - Rider of the Pony Express
The Girl of the Golden West (1908) - Rider of the Pony Express
The First Lady in the Land (1911–12) - James Madison
The Dragon's Claw (1914)
The Eternal Magdalene (1915–16)
The Heart of Wetona (1916) - Anthony Wells
The Guilty Man (1916)
Our Little Wife (1916)
The Knife (1917)
Good Morning, Rosamond (1917)
The Heritage (1918)
The Squab Farm (1918)
A Marriage of Convenience (1918)
Not with My Money (1918)
The Woman in Room 13 (1919)
The Sign on the Door (1919–20) - Frank Devereaux
The Man's Name (1920) - Hal Marvin
Lawful Larceny (1922) - Guy Tarlow
The Fool (1922–23) - Jerry Goodkind
The Masked Woman (1922–23) - Baron Tolento
Morphia (1923) - Julian Wade
Casanova (1923) - Giacomo Casanova
Leah Kleschna (1924) - Raoul Berton
High Stakes (1924) - Joe Lennon
The Woman Disputed (1926–27) - Capt. Friedrich Von Hartmann

Filmography

References

External links

 
 
 

1888 births
1934 deaths
20th-century American male actors
American male child actors
American male film actors
American male silent film actors
American male stage actors
Burials at Forest Lawn Memorial Park (Glendale)
Film directors from California
Deaths from pneumonia in California
Male actors from San Francisco
People from Greater Los Angeles